Johannes (Juho) Kaskinen (30 December 1865, Lokalahti – 2 December 1932) was a Finnish farmer and politician. He served as a Member of the Parliament of Finland, representing the Young Finnish Party from 1908 to 1910 and from 1911 to 1917 and the National Progressive Party from 1919 to 1922 and from 1930 until his death in 1932.

References

1865 births
1932 deaths
People from Uusikaupunki
People from Turku and Pori Province (Grand Duchy of Finland)
Young Finnish Party politicians
National Progressive Party (Finland) politicians
Members of the Parliament of Finland (1908–09)
Members of the Parliament of Finland (1909–10)
Members of the Parliament of Finland (1911–13)
Members of the Parliament of Finland (1913–16)
Members of the Parliament of Finland (1916–17)
Members of the Parliament of Finland (1919–22)
Members of the Parliament of Finland (1930–33)